Ingo Ott Hoffmann (born February 28, 1953) is a Brazilian retired racing driver from São Paulo. He is most well known for winning the Brazilian Stock Car Championship 12 times (1980, 1985, 1989-1994, 1996-1998 and 2002). He also participated in six Formula One Grands Prix, debuting on January 25, 1976.  He scored no championship points.

History

Early career
Hoffman began his career in Brazil competing in Formula Vee and saloon cars. He came to England in 1975 and competed in Formula Three in a March, before moving into Formula One in 1976.

Formula One years
Hoffmann's Formula One career was hindered by the financial problems of the Fittipaldi team, and he drove the team's second car when realistically the team could only afford to run one. This meant Hoffmann only entered certain selected races, and ultimately the second car was dropped altogether. He entered four Grands Prix in 1976, did not qualify for three of them and an eleventh place at Interlagos was the best result achieved. In 1977, Hoffman competed at Buenos Aires (retired, engine) and again at Interlagos where he finished seventh, two laps behind the winner. However, that was Hoffman's last race in Formula One, as the second Fittipaldi entry was withdrawn.

After Formula One

With the end of his Formula One career, Hoffmann competed in Formula 2 for Project Four with a Ralt and a March in 1977 and 1978, (which was his last year in Europe). He also competed in sports cars and saloon cars both in Europe and in South America.
Notably, Ingo Hoffmann has won the Brazilian Stock Car Championship 12 times (1980, 1985, 1989-1994, 1996-1998 and 2002). In 2006 December, he took his 100th win (of the races in the Brazilian circuits) at the Autódromo Internacional Nelson Piquet de Brasília, final race of the 2006 season.

Racing record

Complete European F5000 Championship results
(key) (Races in bold indicate pole position; races in italics indicate fastest lap.)

Complete European Formula Two Championship results
(key) (Races in bold indicate pole position; races in italics indicate fastest lap)

Complete Formula One results
(key)

References

External links

 Instituto Ingo Hoffmann
 Entrevista com Ingo Hoffman - an interview about his career
 Biography at F1 Rejects 

1953 births
Living people
Brazilian racing drivers
Brazilian Formula One drivers
Fittipaldi Formula One drivers
European Formula Two Championship drivers
British Formula Three Championship drivers
FIA European Formula 3 Championship drivers
Stock Car Brasil drivers
TC 2000 Championship drivers
Racing drivers from São Paulo
Brazilian people of German descent